The Human Proteome Project (HPP) is a collaborative effort coordinated by the Human Proteome Organization. Its stated goal is to experimentally observe all of the proteins produced by the sequences translated from the human genome.

History
The Human Proteome Organization has served as a coordinating body for many long-running proteomics research projects associated with specific human tissues of clinical interest, such as blood plasma, liver, brain and urine. It has also been responsible for projects associated with specific technology  and standards  necessary for the large scale study of proteins.

The structure and goals of a larger project that would parallel the Human Genome Project has been debated in the scientific literature. The results of this debate and a series of meetings at the World Congresses of the Human Proteome Organization in 2009, 2010 and 2011 has been the decision to define the Human Proteome Project as being composed of two sub-projects, C-HPP and B/D-HPP. The C-HPP will be organized into 25 groups, one per human chromosome. The B/D-HPP will be organized into groups by the biological and disease relevance of proteins.

Projects and groups
The current set of working groups are listed below, in order of the chromosome to be studied.

Computational resources
Data reduction, analysis and validation of MS/MS based proteomics results is being provided by Eric Deutsch at the Institute for Systems Biology, Seattle, USA (PeptideAtlas). Data handling associated with antibody methods is being coordinated by Kalle von Feilitzen, Stockholm, Sweden (Human Protein Atlas). Overall integration and reporting informatics are the responsibility of Lydie Lane at SIB, Geneva, Switzerland (NeXtProt). All data generated as part of HPP contributions are deposited to one of the ProteomeXchange repositories.

Current status
Updates on the Human Proteome Project are regularly published, e.g. in the Journal of Proteome Research (2014). Metrics for the level of confidence associated with protein observations have been published as has been a "MissingProteinPedia".

Based on a comparison of nine major annotation portals gave a spread of human protein counts from 21,819 to 18,891 (as of 2017). The 2021 Metrics of the HPP show that protein expression has now been credibly detected 92.8% of the predicted proteins coded in the human genome.

See also
 BioPlex
 Human Protein Atlas - Protein databases
 NeXtProt 
 PeptideAtlas

References

External links
HPP project page (www.hupo.org)
HPP web site (www.thehpp.org)
Chromosome-centric HPP web site (www.c-hpp.org)
BD HPP web site (www.hupo.org/B/D-HPP)

Proteomics
Human genome projects
Biological databases